The Union of Greek Shipowners (UGS, or, in its Greek initials, EEE) is a trade association for Greek ship-owners.

Founded in February 1916, it is headquartered in Piraeus, with offices in Brussels and Washington, D.C. The UGS closely follows developments in the United Nations International Maritime Organization (IMO), the International Labour Organization (ILO), the Organisation for Economic Co-operation and Development (OECD), the International Chamber of Commerce (ICC) and other global bodies. The UGS is a member of the International Chamber of Shipping (ICS) and the European Community Shipowners’ Associations (ECSA) and participates in the European Economic and Social Committee (EESC) and the Economic and Social Council of Greece (ESC). The UGS is also a member of the Arctic Economic Council (AEC).

The UGS also maintains close relations with the Hellenic Chamber of Shipping, the London-based Greek Shipping Co-operation Committee (GSCC) and the Hellenic Marine Environment Protection Association (HELMEPA).

Presidents
Since 1916 the Union has been headed by:

 Leonidas Embiricos of Andros, 1916 – 1920
 Vacant, 1920 – 1924
 Stamatios Embiricos of Andros, 1924 – 1934
 Nicolaos Kyriakides of Prokonessos, 1934 – 1935
 Basil Goulandris of Andros, 1935 – 1936
 Michael Pneumaticos of Kasos, 1936 – 1938
 Costas Michalos of Chios, 1938 – 1946
 Loucas Nomicos of Santorini, 1946 – 1950
 Nicolaos Lykiardopoulos of Cephalonia, 1950 – 1960
 Stratis Andreadis of Chios, 1960 – 1974
 Vacant, 1974 – 1975
 Anthony Chandris of Chios, 1975 – 1981
 Aristomenis Karageorgis of Piraeus, 1981 – 1984
 Stathis Gourdomichalis of Athens, 1984 – 1991
 John G. Goumas of Athens, 1991 – 1997
 John Lyras of London (with roots in Chios), 1997 – 2003
 Nicos Efthymiou of Piraeus, 2003 – 2009
 Theodore Veniamis of Chios, 2009 – 2022
 Melina Travlos of Cephalonia, 2022 – present

References

1916 establishments in Greece
Trade associations based in Greece